Cochlicopidae is a taxonomic family of small, air-breathing, land snails, terrestrial pulmonate gastropod mollusks in the superfamily Cochlicopoidea.

Anatomy
In this family, the number of haploid chromosomes lies between 26 and 30 (according to the values in this table).

Taxonomy 
The following two subfamilies have been recognized in the taxonomy of Bouchet & Rocroi (2005):
 subfamily Cochlicopinae Pilsbry, 1900 (1879) - synonyms: Cionellidae L. Pfeiffer, 1879; Zuidae Bourguignat, 1884
 subfamily Azecinae Watson, 1920 - synonym: Cryptazecinae Schileyko, 1999

Genera
The family Cochlicopidae includes the following genera:

subfamily Cochlicopinae
 Cochlicopa Férussac, 1821 - synonym: Cionella Jeffreys, 1830

subfamily Azecinae
Azeca Fleming, 1828
Cryptazeca Folin & Bérillon, 1877
Hypnophila Bourguignat, 1858

References

External links